The rufous-rumped lark (Pinarocorys erythropygia) is a species of lark in the family Alaudidae. It is found in western and central Africa from Mali, Guinea and Sierra Leone to eastern Sudan, South Sudan and north-western Uganda. Its natural habitat is dry savannah.

Originally, the rufous-rumped lark was classified within the genus Alauda. Later, some authorities considered the rufous-rumped lark to be a species within the genera Certhilauda and Mirafra. Alternate common names include red-rumped lark, red-tailed bush lark and red-tailed lark.

References

rufous-rumped lark
Birds of Sub-Saharan Africa
rufous-rumped lark
Taxonomy articles created by Polbot